The GG Duetto was sold as motorcycle-sidecar combination built by Swiss manufacturer Grüter + Gut Motorradtechnik GmbH (GG) between 1994 and 1999. Approximately 30 units were produced.

Unlike a traditional sidecar added to a motorcycle, the GG Duetto is built to function only as a sidecar. While many manufacturers offer kits to convert existing motorcycles for sidecar operation, the GG Duetto was only sold as a fully assembled vehicle not registered as a vehicle produced by BMW motorcycles.

Technical data
 Aluminum single-sided swingarm
 Hub-center steering
 GG built eight piston front brake caliper
 Electric motor operated sidecar access
 Antilock brakes on all three wheels
 Specific built Marchesini wheels
 Electrically height adjustable sidecar windscreen
 GFK laminate body

Reviews
 Cycle World August 1996 Issue

See also
Krauser Domani

External links
  GG Duetto information and pictures
 G+G Website
 Cycle World Magazine August 1996 Issue

Sidecars
BMW
Tricycle motorcycles